Eugene Elliott Aldrich (April 20, 1898 – February 26, 1959) was an American football and basketball coach. He served as the head football coach at Saint John's University in Collegeville, Minneosta in 1924, compiling a record of 1–4–1. He was also the head basketball coach at for the 1924–25 season, tallying a mark of 6–8

Head coaching record

College football

References

1898 births
1959 deaths
Basketball coaches from Minnesota
Saint John's Johnnies basketball coaches
Saint John's Johnnies football coaches
Sportspeople from Saint Paul, Minnesota
Players of American football from Saint Paul, Minnesota